Anatoli Gospodinov (born 21 March 1994) is a Bulgarian football goalkeeper who plays for Arda Kardzhali.

Career statistics

Club

Honours

Club
CSKA Sofia
 Bulgarian Cup: 2015–16

References

External links

1994 births
Living people
Bulgarian footballers
Bulgarian expatriate footballers
Expatriate footballers in Poland
First Professional Football League (Bulgaria) players
I liga players
OFC Sliven 2000 players
PFC CSKA Sofia players
FC Vitosha Bistritsa players
Chrobry Głogów players
SFC Etar Veliko Tarnovo players
Association football goalkeepers
Sportspeople from Sliven